Chapter 1: Snake Oil is the second studio album by American DJ and musician Diplo, under his moniker Thomas Wesley. It was released on May 29, 2020 under his label Mad Decent and Columbia Records.

The album features collaborations by Orville Peck, Noah Cyrus, Thomas Rhett and Young Thug.

Critical reception

Chapter 1: Snake Oil was met with generally mixed to unfavorable reviews from critics. At Metacritic, which assigns a weighted average rating out of 100 to reviews from mainstream publications, the release received an average score of 46, based on 9 reviews.

Track listing 
Credits adapted from Tidal.

Notes
  indicates a miscellaneous producer.

Personnel 
Credits adapted from Tidal.

Musicians

 Diplo – drums , programming , remixer 
 King Henry – bass , drums , guitar , programming 
 Thomas Lea – violin 
 Charlie Handsome – guitar 
 Diablo – programming 
 Jr Blender – drums and programming 
 Ryan Tedder – drums and programming 
 Maximilian Jaeger – drum machine , drums , programming , guitar , keyboards 
 Philip von Boch Scully – drums and programming 
 William John Wilde – harmonica 
 MØ – vocals 
 Orville Peck – bass, guitar, and piano 
 Tommy Brenneck – piano 
 Matt Zara – guitar 
 Great Dane – drums and programming 
 Jocelyn "Jozzy" Donald – background vocals 

Technical

 Eric Lagg – mastering 
 Joe LaPorta – mastering 
 Chris Gehringer – mastering 
 Maximilian Jaeger – mixing , recording 
 Sean Moffitt – mixing 
 Serban Ghenea – mixing 
 A Bainz – mixing 
 Zaq Reynolds – recording 
 Analog in the Digital – recording 
 King Henry – recording 
 Cinco – recording 
 Ernesto Olvera-LaPier – engineering 
 Joey Moi – engineering 
 John Hanes – engineering 
 Rich Rich – engineering 
 Joe Grasso – engineering 
 Lindsay Marias – vocal production 
 Ryan Tedder – vocal production 
 Hauf – vocal production 
 Benjamin Rice – vocal production 
 Andrew "VoxGod" Bolooki – vocal production 
 Jocelyn "Jozzy" Donald – vocal production 
 Jesse Brock – engineering assistance

Charts

Weekly charts

Year-end charts

Certifications

References

2020 albums
Diplo albums
Columbia Records albums